John Cashman (born 1997) is an Irish hurler who plays for Cork Senior Championship club Blackrock. He is a former member of the Cork senior hurling team. Cashman usually lines out as a right corner-back.

Biography

The Cashman family name is associated with the Blackrock club, and Cashman's father, Jim, and his uncle, Tom, won a total of six All-Ireland Championship medals between 1977 and 1990. His grandfather, Mick Cashman, and his granduncle, Jimmy Brohan, were members of Cork's three-in-a-row All-Ireland Championship-winning team between 1952 and 1954. Cashman's brother, Niall, was also a member of the Cork senior team.

Honours

Blackrock
Cork Premier Senior Hurling Championship (1): 2020 
Cork Under-21 Hurling Championship (1): 2015

Cork
Munster Under-21 Hurling Championship (1): 2018

References

External links
2018 Cork Under-21 Hurling team player profiles at the Cork GAA website

1997 births
Living people
Blackrock National Hurling Club hurlers
Cork inter-county hurlers
Hurling backs